Act III is the third studio album by the thrash metal band Death Angel, released in 1990 on Geffen Records. This is the band's final studio album to feature guitarist Gus Pepa, and their only recording on Geffen. It was also their last studio album before their ten-year hiatus from 1991 to 2001.

Overview 
Regarded by many critics and fans as the band's finest effort, Act III was co-produced Max Norman (known for his work with Ozzy Osbourne, Megadeth, Savatage, Fates Warning and Loudness) and Tom Zutaut. This album once again presented a change in style for Death Angel, and is considerably much darker than its predecessors. While retaining some of the speed and thrash elements of their debut album The Ultra-Violence (1987), it also saw the band continuing the experimentation of Frolic Through the Park (1988), drawing elements and influences from a variety of musical styles such as funk, folk, progressive, traditional heavy metal, hard rock and punk rock.

Reception 

Act III was successful in Europe, entering the album charts in France, Belgium, Switzerland, Hungary and the Netherlands. Although the album failed to break the band in their native America, the music videos for its singles, "Seemingly Endless Time" and "A Room with a View", received regular rotation on MTV's Headbangers Ball. In October 2020, Death Angel released an almost entirely acoustic version of "A Room With a View" on their Under Pressure EP.

Adam McCann of Metal Digest called Act III "an early 90's classic thrash album", and wrote, "There was something always a little bit more technical and progressive about Death Angel, but with Act III, the band found the perfect combination of thrash, technical and accessibility as they created a beast which saw the band achieve MTV heavy rotation with 'A Room With a View' and 'Seemingly Endless Time'. Check any list of the best heavy metal albums of all time and nine times out of ten, you'll find Act III."

Act III was listed as number 328 in the 2010 reference book, The Top 500 Heavy Metal Albums of All Time.

Track listing

Personnel 
Death Angel
Mark Osegueda – lead vocals
Rob Cavestany – lead guitar, backing vocals, mixing
Gus Pepa – guitar
Dennis Pepa – bass, backing vocals on track 6
Andy Galeon – drums, backing vocals, mixing

Production
Max Norman – producer, engineer, mixing in November 1989 at Skip Saylor Recording, Los Angeles, California
Stoli Jaeger – engineer
Chris "Holmes" Puram – second engineer
George Marino – mastering at Sterling Sound, New York City
Tom Zutaut – executive producer

References 

Death Angel albums
1990 albums
Albums produced by Max Norman
Geffen Records albums